Charles Cento (born 6 August 1893, date of death unknown) was a French racing cyclist. He rode in the 1920 Tour de France.

References

1893 births
Year of death missing
French male cyclists